URB597 (KDS-4103) is a relatively selective and irreversible inhibitor of the enzyme fatty acid amide hydrolase (FAAH).  FAAH is the primary degradatory enzyme for the endocannabinoid anandamide and, as such, inhibition of FAAH leads to an accumulation of anandamide in the CNS and periphery where it activates cannabinoid receptors.  URB597 has been found to elevate anandamide levels and have activity against neuropathic pain in a mouse model.

Preclinical studies have shown FAAH inhibitors to increase BDNF levels in the hippocampus and prefrontal cortex, highlighting their potential in addiction treatment as "enviromimetics". Indeed, Chauvet et al. found that chronic URB597 administration in rats "significantly reduces cocaine-seeking behaviour and cue- and stress-induced relapse".

URB597 was at one point being developed by Kadmus Pharmaceuticals, Inc. for clinical trials in humans.

See also
 FAAH
 4-Nonylphenylboronic acid
 LY-2183240
 PF-04457845

References

External links
Modulation of anxiety through blockade of anandamide hydrolysis in Nature

Antidepressants
Benzamides
Phenol esters
Carbamates
Endocannabinoid reuptake inhibitors
Biphenyls
Cyclohexyl compounds